Marooned is a 1933 British drama film directed by Leslie S. Hiscott and starring Edmund Gwenn and Viola Lyel. It was made at Beaconsfield Studios as a quota quickie.

Cast
 Edmund Gwenn as Tom Roberts  
 Viola Lyel as Sarah Roberts 
 Iris March as Mary Roberts  
 Victor Garland as Norman Bristowe  
 Hal Walters as Joe  
 Wally Patch as Wilson  
 Philip Hewland as Jacob  
 Wilfred Shine as Maille

References

Bibliography
 Low, Rachael. Filmmaking in 1930s Britain. George Allen & Unwin, 1985.
 Wood, Linda. British Films, 1927-1939. British Film Institute, 1986.

External links

1933 films
British drama films
1933 drama films
1930s English-language films
Films shot at Beaconsfield Studios
Films directed by Leslie S. Hiscott
Quota quickies
British black-and-white films
1930s British films